John Ernest Huntington (23 May 1893 – 17 July 1971) was an Australian rules footballer who played with Melbourne in the Victorian Football League (VFL).

Notes

External links 

1893 births
Australian rules footballers from Victoria (Australia)
Melbourne Football Club players
1971 deaths